Leviton's gecko (Altiphylax levitoni) is a species of gecko, a lizard in the family Gekkonidae. The species is endemic to Asia.

Etymology
The specific name, levitoni, is in honor of American herpetologist Alan E. Leviton (born 1930).

Geographic range
A. levitoni is found in north-eastern Afghanistan.

References

Altiphylax
Reptiles described in 1979